The men's flyweight (51 kilograms) event at the 2002 Asian Games took place from 5 to 13 October 2002 at Masan Gymnasium, Masan, South Korea.

Like all Asian Games boxing events, the competition was a straight single-elimination tournament. This event consisted of sixteen boxers.

Schedule
All times are Korea Standard Time (UTC+09:00)

Results 
Legend
RSCO — Won by referee stop contest outclassed

References

External links
Official website

51